"Café del Mar" is a song first released in 1993 by the trance project Energy 52. It is named after the famous bar located in Ibiza, Balearic Islands, Spain. Almost instantly recognisable by its distinct melody, its popularity is reflected in the countless remixes that have since been created as well as its being featured on hundreds of CD compilations. The main melody of "Café del Mar" is based on "Struggle for Pleasure" by Belgian composer Wim Mertens.

The song has charted three times in the UK Singles Chart, all featuring remixes by Three 'N One. It first made number 51 in March 1997, a second release ("Café del Mar '98") featuring a Nalin & Kane remix reached number 12 in July 1998, and a further release featuring remixes by Marco V reached number 24 in October 2002.

The song was included on the soundtrack to the 1999 movie Human Traffic. In 2001 it was voted number one in Mixmag'''s "100 Best Tunes Ever" list. In 2011 it was voted number one out of fifty nominated tracks in the 'Top 20 Dance Tracks of Last 20 Years' users poll by listeners of BBC Radio 1.

List of remixes (non-comprehensive)

1993
Cosmic Baby's Impression (6:45)
Kid Paul Mix (7:16) >> aka Original Mix
Peace Mix (7:13)
Porte de Bagnolet Mix (5:53)

1997
Ivan Remix (8:06)
Josh Abrahams' Down Under Remix (7:03) 
Kid Paul Radio Mix (3:32)
Oliver Lieb Radio Mix 1 (3:55)
Oliver Lieb Radio Mix 2 (3:40)
Oliver Lieb's LSG Remix (7:44) >> aka Oliver Lieb Mix 1
Oliver Lieb Mix 2 (7:30)
Solarstone Remix (8:37)
Three'n'One Radio Mix (3:50)
Three'n'One Remix (8:43)
Universal State Of Mind Mix (7:15)

1998
Hybrid's Time Traveller Remix (6:36)
Kinky Roland Remix (8:22)
Nalin & Kane Radio Cut (3:57)
Nalin & Kane Remix Edit (9:16)
Nalin & Kane Remix (9:44)
Three'n'One Radio Mix 2 (3:37)
Three'n'One Remix (8:15)

1999
Deepsky's Stateside Cannon Remix (7:35)
Kid Paul's '99 Rebuild (7:45) >> not released
Pure Nova & DJ Eyal Project Remix (7:50)

2000
Humate Ambient Remix (7:07) >> limited pre-release 
Michael Woods Ambient Remix (10:26) >> limited pre-release 
Sonique Version 52 (8:01) >> bootleg with Sonique - It Feels So Good

2002
Humate Ambient Remix Edit (6:33)
Humate Ambient Remix (7:07) 
John "00" Fleming Remix (10:07)
Marco V Radio Edit (3:08)
Marco V Remix Edit (6:58)
Marco V Remix (8:34)
Michael Woods Ambient Mix Edit (9:26)
Michael Woods Ambient Mix (10:26)
Three'n'One Update Radio Edit (3:19)
Three'n'One Update (8:55)

2003
Chicane Remix (3:27)

2006
Raul Rincon Mix (7:54)
Tall Paul Remix (8:30)
Soul Seekerz Remix (7:32)
K-Klass Remix (8:53)
Kenny Hayes Remix (7:52)

2007
Alien Project - Activation Portal contains psytrance tracks with the "Cafe del Mar" anthem
(tracks 3 "NRG" and 9 "Yellow Blaze")
Hardino Remix
K & H Tribute Remix

2008
Michael Woods and Marcella Woods "Out of Office" Remix (7:42)
Deadmau5 Remix (7:34)
Dabruck & Klein Remix (Bootleg) (8:16)
Asom Remix (8:54)
Whelan & Di Scala Remix (8:20)
Oliver Lang Remix (8:13)
Dave Robertson Remix (7:37)
David Puentez Bootleg Mix (7:40)
Bruckmann 2008 Remix (8:13)

2011
Rigel Remix (7:40) >> not released
Ricardo Villalobos Remix (9:30) (Flying Circus Records, 12" & Digital Release)
Ricardo Villalobos Dub (11:45) (Flying Circus Records, 12" & Digital Release)
 eigenspace - Cafe Del Mar (eigenspace twenty-eleven mash) (10.05)

2012
Lowland (Orchestral Version), taken from the album Classical Trancelations by Lowland''

2014
Radio Edit by Paul Oakenfold (7:40) for Trance Mission (2014)
Liam Van Dyke - Cafe del Mar (First Class Lounge Cut) (4:36)

2015
Version by Beat Service (5:14)

2016
Tim Engelhardt Remix
Mario Da Ragnio Remix
Marcel Janovsky Remix
Dale Middleton Remix
Dimitri Vegas & Like Mike vs Klaas Edit [Mattn & Futuristic Polar Bears]

2018
Tale Of Us (Renaissance Remix) (8:30)
David Gravell Remix (5:00)

2019
Jonatan Seara Mix (9:48)

2020
Jean Carles Ferrer "2020" Remix (7:48)

2021
Paul van Dyk Xoxo Remix
Paul van Dyk SHINE Remix

2022
Cover by Dimitri Vegas & Like Mike vs. Vini Vici vs. MATTN

Certifications

Notes and references

External links
Energy 52 at Discogs.com
Energy 52 at global-trance.co.uk
tranceaddict forums
Cafe del Mar on the mega-t album

Cafe del Mar
Trance songs
1993 songs